Gardner House may refer to:

in the United States
(by state)
 Isaac Gardner, Sr., House, Tampa, Florida, listed on the National Register of Historic Places (NRHP)
 Robert W. Gardner House, Quincy, Illinois, NRHP-listed
 Gardner House (Northtown, Kentucky), listed on the NRHP in Kentucky
 Judge D. W. Gardner House, Salyersville, Kentucky, listed on the NRHP in Kentucky
 Isabella Stewart Gardner Museum, Boston, Massachusetts, NRHP-listed
 Addington Gardner House, Sherborn, Massachusetts, NRHP-listed
 Francis L. Gardner House, Swansea, Massachusetts, NRHP-listed
 Joseph Gardner House, Swansea, Massachusetts, NRHP-listed
 Preserved Gardner House, Swansea, Massachusetts, NRHP-listed
 Samuel Gardner House, Swansea, Massachusetts, NRHP-listed
 Edward Gardner House, Winchester, Massachusetts, NRHP-listed
 O. W. Gardner House, Winchester, Massachusetts, NRHP-listed
 Patience and Sarah Gardner House, Winchester, Massachusetts, NRHP-listed
 Gardner House (Albion, Michigan), listed on the NRHP in Michigan
 Gardner House (Palmyra, Missouri), listed on the NRHP in Missouri
 Terhune-Gardner-Lindenmeyr House, Paramus, New Jersey, NRHP-listed
 Wentworth-Gardner and Tobias Lear Houses, Portsmouth, New Hampshire, NRHP-listed
 Wentworth-Gardner House, Portsmouth, New Hampshire, NRHP-listed
 Silas Gardner House, Gardnertown, New York, NRHP-listed
 Gardner House (Guilderland, New York), NRHP-listed
 Gardner House (Jamestown, North Carolina), listed on the NRHP in North Carolina
 Gardner House (Worthington, Ohio), listed on the NRHP in Ohio
 Jefferson Gardner House, Eagletown, OK, listed on the NRHP in Oklahoma
 Gardner-Bailey House, Pittsburgh, Pennsylvania, NRHP-listed
 Ezekial Gardner House, North Kingstown, Rhode Island, NRHP-listed
 R. R. Gardner House, South Kingstown, Rhode Island, NRHP-listed
 Matt Gardner House, Elkton, Tennessee, listed on the NRHP in Tennessee
 James H. and Rhoda H. Gardner House, Lehi, Utah, NRHP-listed
 James Gardner House, Mendon, Utah, listed on the NRHP in Utah
 Ira W. Gardner House, Salem, Utah, NRHP-listed
 Archibald R. and Violet Clark Gardner House, Sandy, Utah, listed on the NRHP in Salt Lake County, Utah
 Gardner-Mays Cottage, Charlottesville, Virginia, NRHP-listed
 Crawford-Gardner House, Charleston, West Virginia, NRHP-listed